Watton railway station was located in Watton, Norfolk. It was on the Great Eastern Railway line between Swaffham and Thetford, and closed for passengers in 1964 and freight in 1965 as part of the Beeching Axe.

References

External links
 The railway in Watton

Disused railway stations in Norfolk
Former Great Eastern Railway stations
Beeching closures in England
Railway stations in Great Britain opened in 1869
Railway stations in Great Britain closed in 1964
1869 establishments in England
Watton, Norfolk